Petrochromis orthognathus is a species of cichlid endemic to Lake Tanganyika found in areas with rocky substrates on which they can graze on algae. It can be found in the aquarium trade.

References

orthognathus
Fish described in 1959
Taxa named by Hubert Matthes
Taxonomy articles created by Polbot